Harold Powers "Brick" Muller (June 12, 1901 – May 17, 1962) was a professional football player-coach for the Los Angeles Buccaneers during their only season in the National Football League in 1926. He was also an American track and field athlete who competed mainly in the high jump. Muller competed for the United States in the 1920 Summer Olympics held in Antwerp, Belgium in the high jump, where he won the Silver Medal. He got nicknamed "the Brick" because of his flaming red hair.

Football

Muller grew up in Dunsmuir, California and later attended the University of California, Berkeley where he was a member of the Sigma Chi fraternity. Prior to attending Cal, Muller attended San Diego High School. When Nibs Price was hired by Cal coach Andy Smith as one of his Cal assistants, he encouraged his San Diego
High School players to accompany him to Berkeley. Muller and six other graduates from San Diego High School later played on Cal's undefeated, untied 1920 "Wonder Team". In the 1921 Rose Bowl, he completed a touchdown pass to Brodie Stephens that went at least 53 yards in the air. He was later voted the Most Valuable Player of the game. Muller became a star end at Cal and was the first player in the western United States to receive All-American honors in 1921 and 1922.

Track and field
Muller was also a member of the California track and field team. The Bears won the ICAAAA championships in 1921, 1922, and 1923, and also won the second NCAA championships. Muller placed second in the Broad jump, third in the High Jump, and fourth in the Discus Throw.

Los Angeles Buccaneers
After graduating from Cal, Muller wanted to become an orthopedic surgeon. He was accepted into the University of California's Medical School, but was in need of money. To help supplement his income while in medical school, Andy Smith hired Muller to coach the ends on the Cal varsity. While in school Muller coached from 1923 to 1925, until Smith died from pneumonia in 1926. After he became a physician, Brick played in the first East-West Shrine Game. Prior to the game, he caught a pass thrown from atop the Telephone Building—a drop of 320 feet (97.5 m). During the game, he caught a 27-yard pass for a touchdown. Ed R. Hughes of the San Francisco Chronicle wrote in his column: "Remember Muller has been out of college for three years, but right now he is by far the
greatest end in the West, and probably one of the best that ever played!!" This led to Muller being signed by the Los Angeles Buccaneers. He soon became the player and head coach of the team. He led the Buccaneers to a 6-3-1 record in 1926. The team later folded in 1927.

After football
After playing with the Buccaneers in 1926, Muller became an orthopedic surgeon. During World War II Muller served with the Army Medical School with the rank of major, and in 1956 he served as the Head Team Physician for the United States Olympic Team. However, the honors kept coming. In the late 1940s, Collier's magazine senior editor James N. Young, who had compiled All-America data for almost half a century, chose Muller on his All-Time All-America eleven.

In 1953, Muller was also inducted by the San Diego Hall of Champions into the Breitbard Hall of Fame honoring San Diego's finest athletes both on and off the playing surface. and the College Football Hall of Fame in 1951.

Brick Muller Award
The Brick Muller Award, established in 1949, is named in honor of Muller. It is presented to the most valuable lineman on the Cal team. Players who won the award three times include Ralph DeLoach, E (defense; 1977–79), Harvey Salem, T (offense; 1980–82), Majett Whiteside, NG (defense; 1985–87); Andre Carter, DE (defense; 1998-2000), and Mitchell Schwartz, left tackle (offense; 2009–11).

References

External links

 
 

1901 births
1962 deaths
American football ends
American male high jumpers
Athletes (track and field) at the 1920 Summer Olympics
California Golden Bears football players
California Golden Bears men's track and field athletes
Los Angeles Buccaneers coaches
Los Angeles Buccaneers players
Olympic silver medalists for the United States in track and field
All-American college football players
College Football Hall of Fame inductees
United States Army personnel of World War II
United States Army officers
People from Dunsmuir, California
Players of American football from San Diego
Medalists at the 1920 Summer Olympics
Track and field athletes from San Diego
Track and field athletes in the National Football League
Military personnel from California
San Diego High School alumni